Luke Kendall (born 25 May 1981) is an Australian basketball coach and former player. He played seven years in the National Basketball League (NBL) between 2004 and 2011, winning a championship in 2005.

Early life
Kendall was born in Melbourne, Victoria. He attended Box Hill Senior Secondary College and played for the Kilsyth Cobras in the SEABL in 1999 and 2000.

College career
Kendall played four years of NCAA Division II college basketball for Metro State between 2000 and 2004. The Roadrunners won the NCAA Division II championship in 2002 and Kendall was named first-team All-Rocky Mountain Athletic Conference in 2003.

Professional career
After graduating college in 2004, Kendall returned to the Kilsyth Cobras in the SEABL. He then joined the Sydney Kings of the NBL for the 2004–05 season. He was a contender for NBL Rookie of the Year in 2005 before a knee injury ended his season after just 12 games. The Kings went on to win the 2004–05 NBL championship.

After four seasons with the Kings, the team folded following the 2007–08 NBL season. He subsequently joined the Perth Wildcats for 2008–09 NBL season. He left the Wildcats in December 2008 after 12 games, and in January 2009 he joined the Melbourne Tigers for the remainder of the 2008–09 season. He continued on with the Tigers for the 2009–10 NBL season.

The Kings returned to the NBL in the 2010–11 season. Kendall played one game for the Kings in November 2010 before joining the Gold Coast Blaze in February 2011 for the rest of the season.

Kendall finished his NBL career with 173 games and averages of 10.6 points, 3.5 rebounds and 3.6 assists per game.

Kendall returned to the SEABL in 2011 and played for the Nunawading Spectres. He then played for the Sandringham Sabres in 2012. Between 2013 and 2014, he played in the Waratah League for the Sydney Comets.

National team career
Kendall represented Australia at the 2001 World Championship for Young Men, 2006 FIBA Stanković Continental Champions' Cup, 2006 FIBA World Championship, and 2007 FIBA Oceania Championship. He was also a member of the Australian team that won the gold medal at the 2006 Commonwealth Games.

Coaching career
Between 2015 and 2017, Kendall served as coach of the Sydney Comets in the Waratah League.

Kendall joined the Sydney Kings for the 2016–17 NBL season in a part-time coaching role. He was promoted to a full-time assistant coach for the 2017–18 season.

After three years with the Kings, Kendall joined the South East Melbourne Phoenix in a part-time player development role in 2019 for their inaugural NBL season. He was promoted to a full-time assistant coach for the 2020–21 season. He left the Phoenix in May 2022.

References

External links
NBL profile

1981 births
Living people
Australian men's basketball players
Basketball players at the 2006 Commonwealth Games
Commonwealth Games gold medallists for Australia
Commonwealth Games medallists in basketball
Gold Coast Blaze players
Melbourne Tigers players
Metro State Roadrunners men's basketball players
Perth Wildcats players
Point guards
Shooting guards
South East Melbourne Phoenix coaches
Sydney Kings coaches
Sydney Kings players
2006 FIBA World Championship players
Basketball players from Melbourne
Sportsmen from Victoria (Australia)
Australian expatriate basketball people in the United States
Medallists at the 2006 Commonwealth Games